The 3rd constituency of Meurthe-et-Moselle is a French legislative constituency in the Meurthe-et-Moselle département.

Description

Meurthe-et-Moselle's 3rd constituency was radically altered prior to the 2012 elections so that it no longer contains any of the territory of the previous incarnation, which consisted of the cantons of Laxou, Nancy-Ouest et Pompey. The new version covers the northernmost areas of Meurthe-et-Moselle up to the border with Luxembourg and Belgium.

The seat was won comfortably by the Socialist Party candidate Christian Eckert in a second round run off against the UMP in 2012.

Historic Representation

Election results

2022 

 
 
|-
| colspan="8" bgcolor="#E9E9E9"|
|-
 

 
 
 
 
 

* Herbays stood as a dissident PS member, without the support of the party or the NUPES alliance. The 2017 PS result is counted with NUPES for swing calculations.

2017

2012

 
 
 
 
 
|-
| colspan="8" bgcolor="#E9E9E9"|
|-

Sources
Official results of French elections from 2002: "Résultats électoraux officiels en France" (in French).

3